A Night with the Jersey Devil is a song by the American rock singer-songwriter Bruce Springsteen.

The song was released as a download-only single, accompanied by a video, on October 31, 2008, as a "Halloween treat" on the artist's website. This release featured a handwritten note by Springsteen:

Dear Friends and Fans, if you grew up in central or south Jersey, you grew up with the "Jersey Devil." Here's a little musical Halloween treat. Have fun! - Bruce Springsteen

The video is included the deluxe edition DVD of Springsteen's Working on a Dream album, released in 2009. It is a blues tune with bullet mic vocals, including portions of the Gene Vincent 1958 song "Baby Blue" (specifically, one verse – featured here as the last verse), and therefore Springsteen shares the song's writing credits with the two co-writers of "Baby Blue", Robert Jones and Gene Vincent.

Springsteen's lyrics tell the story of a legendary creature known as the "Jersey Devil"; in 1735 a woman called "Mother Leeds" gave birth to her 13th child, who metamorphosed into an evil creature with bat wings, forked feet and a horse's head; because of this, his parents threw him in a river where he drowned and now haunts the Pine Barrens in New Jersey.

The song was released on 7" vinyl along with "What Love Can Do" on April 18, 2009, as part of the Record Store Day promotion.

References

External links
 A Night With The Jersey Devil Lyrics
 Gene Vincent singing "Baby Blue"
 Official Robert Jones website
 Official Bruce Springsteen website

Bruce Springsteen songs
Songs written by Bruce Springsteen
2008 songs
Jersey Devil in fiction